Choeroichthys suillus (pigsnout pipefish or barred short-bodied pipefish) is a species of marine fish of the family Syngnathidae. It is endemic to Australia, occurring from Perth, along northern Australia, to southern Queensland. This species is ovoviviparous, with males carrying eggs and giving birth to live young. Within the reef it is found among coral rubble.

References

Further reading

Australian Government Department of the Environment and Energy

suillus
Marine fish
Fish described in 1951